The Blue Ribbon Award for Best Supporting Actor is as part of its annual Blue Ribbon Awards for Japanese film, to recognize a male supporting actor who has delivered an outstanding performance.

List of winners

References

External links
Blue Ribbon Awards on IMDb

Awards established in 1951
1951 establishments in Japan
Supporting actor
Film awards for supporting actor